Gisela Dulko was the defending champion, but chose not to participate that year.

Second-seeded Alizé Cornet won in the final 7–6(7–5), 6–3, against Andreja Klepač.

Seeds
The top two seeds receive a bye into the second round.

Draw

Finals

Top half

Bottom half

External links
Draw and Qualifying draw

Singles
Budapest Grand Prix